Karen Kotte (died 1590) was a Danish merchant. 

Daughter of the mayor of Odense, merchant Jørgen Nielsen Kotte (d. 1584) and Kirsten Peder Christophersdatter (d. 1583) and in 1572 married to merchant Claus Mikkelsen. During the war of 1563-1570 she financed the Danish military in companionship with Oluf Bager and Hans Mule for credit or the corn of the crown. Her house in Odense housed the royal family during their visit to Funen and also functioned as a custody for people in debt. She had two daughters: after her death, her son-in-law's conflict for the inheritance was solved by the monarch in 1593.

References 
 http://www.kvinfo.dk/side/597/bio/519/origin/170/ (Danish)

1590 deaths
People from Odense
Year of birth unknown
16th-century Danish businesswomen
16th-century Danish businesspeople
Danish merchants